Dermomurex antonius is a species of sea snail, a marine gastropod mollusk in the family Muricidae, the murex snails or rock snails.

Description
The length of the shell varies between 15 mm and 26 mm.

Distribution
This marine species occurs off Northwest Australia.

References

 Merle D., Garrigues B. & Pointier J.-P. (2011) Fossil and Recent Muricidae of the world. Part Muricinae. Hackenheim: Conchbooks. 648 pp. page(s): 227

Gastropods described in 1974
Dermomurex